The 1860 general election in Costa Rica was held one year after the previous elections in which Juan Rafael Mora Porras was re-elected. However, Mora was deposed months after his reelection and one of the coup leaders, José María Montealegre Fernández, assumed power. Montealegre immediately called for elections and a Constituent Assembly. The Moristas postulated Manuel Mora Fernández, relative of Juan Rafael, without success.

References

Elections in Costa Rica
1860 elections in Central America
1860 in Costa Rica